The Orbeliani Palace or the Atoneli Residence is the official residence of the President of Georgia.  It is located on Atoneli street in Central Tbilisi.

History

Origins and usage throughout the times 
The original building, which no longer survives, dates back to the 18th century and was a gift of King Teimuraz II of Kakheti to his son-in-law Dimitry, brother of Sulkhan-Saba Orbeliani. That earlier building was destroyed and the current one was built in its place at the end of the 19th century. The last inhabitant of the palace was Grigol Orbeliani. At one point, the building served as the U.S. Embassy in Georgia. In 2013, about 25 million Georgian lari was spent on the renovation of the palace.

Presidential residence 
Georgian politician and former French diplomat Salome Zourabichvili announced during her 2018 presidential campaign that she would not work from the Avlabari Presidential Palace if elected. That palace, which was opened in July 2009, was built during the Presidency of Mikheil Saakashvili, with whom Zourabichvili had a fallout. Zourabichvili stated that she preferred Orbeliani Palace because it was more understated and that members of the House of Orbeliani and Baratashvili, who once resided there, were her historical ancestors.

After her election, she met with the outgoing President Giorgi Margvelashvili in the Avlabari Palace before moving into the Orbeliani Palace on 18 December 2018.

Interior 

 Amra Hall
 Galaktion Hall
 Golden Fleece Hall
 Prometheus Hall
 Rustaveli Hall
 Sulkhan-Saba Orbeliani Presidential Cabinet

Gallery

References

External links

Presidents of Georgia
Presidential residences
Buildings and structures in Tbilisi
Government buildings in Georgia (country)